The Best of TV Quiz & Game Show Themes was the 2000 follow-up to the bestselling Classic TV Game Show Themes CD, released by Varèse Sarabande.  Like the original, the CD contained 20 tracks.

Track listing

 Match Game - "A Swingin' Safari" - Bert Kaempfert (3:06)
 Password - "You Know the Password" - Bob Cobert (2:10)
 To Tell the Truth - Bob Cobert (2:10)
 Beat the Clock - "Subway Polka" - Harry Geller and his Orchestra (2:37)
 The Price Is Right - "Window Shopping" - Bob Cobert (1:41)
 What's My Line? -  Score Productions (2:02)
 Hollywood Squares - "Merrill's and Bob's Theme" - William Loose (2:48)
 The Joker's Wild - "The Savers" - Gershon Kingsley & Jean-Jacques Perrey (1:43)
 Monopoly - Mort Lindsey (2:03)
 Let's Make a Deal - "On With the Show" - Sheldon Allman & Marilyn Hall (1:31)
 Wheel of Fortune - "Big Wheels" - Alan Thicke (2:17)
 Tattletales - "Tell Those Tales" - Score Productions (2:50)
 Blockbusters - "California Gold Rush" - Bob Cobert (2:22)
 Break the Bank - "Hustle The Bank" - Stuart Zachary Levin (2:45)
 The Gong Show - "Hitting the Gong" - Chuck Barris (1:35)
 The Diamond Head Game - "Diamond Head" - Alan Thicke (2:01)
 The $10,000 Pyramid - "Tuning Up" - Ken Aldin (3:03)
 High Rollers - "Bubble Gum" - Bob Israel (1:25)
 Split Second - "Get Wacky" - Stan Worth (2:15)
 Rock & Roll Jeopardy! (also used occasionally for the List of Jeopardy! tournaments and events) - Steve Kaplan & Douglas Mackaskill (2:15)

See also
 Classic TV Game Show Themes
 One Tree Hill Euphoria 2012 Character Quiz

Game shows
2000 compilation albums
Television soundtracks
Soundtrack compilation albums
Television theme song albums
Varèse Sarabande compilation albums